Hannikainen is a Finnish surname. Notable people with the surname include:

 Pietari Hannikainen (1813-1899), Finnish writer and journalist
 Pekka Juhani Hannikainen (1854–1924), Finnish composer
 Alli Hannikainen (1867-1949), Finnish choir director and singing teacher
 Ilmari Hannikainen (1892–1955), Finnish pianist and composer
 Tauno Hannikainen (1896–1968), Finnish cellist and conductor
 Arvo Hannikainen (1897-1942),  Finnish violinist and composer 
 Väinö Hannikainen (1900-1960), Finnish harpist and composer
 Heikki Hannikainen (1915–1989), Finnish diplomat
 Ann-Elise Hannikainen (1946–2012), Finnish composer
 Tuomas Hannikainen (born 1965), Finnish conductor and violinist
 Markus Hännikäinen (born 1993), Finnish ice hockey player

Finnish-language surnames
Surnames of Finnish origin